Jorge A. DePaula (born November 10, 1978) is a Dominican Republic former right-handed pitcher who pitched 27 innings  in Major League Baseball in 2003–05.

1997–2001
On January 13, DePaula signed with the Colorado Rockies and pitched in their organization until April 20, when he was sent to the New York Yankees as the player to be named later for Craig Dingman.

2001–2006
DePaula played in the Yankees minor leagues until . After spending most of the year with the Triple-A Columbus Clippers. He pitched in Major League Baseball for the New York Yankees from -. He first pitched for the team after September callups in the 2003 season, but his main presence was not known until the beginning of the  season, when he was the team's fifth starter. However, after only one start and two relief appearances, it was clear that he needed Tommy John surgery, and did not pitch again at the major league level until September 2 of the next season.

2007–2012
In , DePaula pitched in the Rockies organization again, playing for the Double-A Tulsa Drillers and Triple-A Colorado Springs Sky Sox. On April 22, DePaula signed with the Edmonton Cracker-Cats of the Golden Baseball League. He played for Vaqueros Laguna of the Mexican League in 2012.

References

External links

1978 births
Living people
Arizona League Rockies players
Asheville Tourists players
Colorado Springs Sky Sox players
Columbus Clippers players
Dominican Republic expatriate baseball players in Canada
Dominican Republic expatriate baseball players in Mexico
Dominican Republic expatriate baseball players in the United States
Edmonton Cracker-Cats players
Greensboro Bats players
Leones del Escogido players
Major League Baseball pitchers
Major League Baseball players from the Dominican Republic
Mexican League baseball pitchers
Navegantes del Magallanes players
Dominican Republic expatriate baseball players in Venezuela
New York Yankees players
Norwich Navigators players
People from Monte Plata Province
Portland Rockies players
Saraperos de Saltillo players
Tampa Yankees players
Tiburones de La Guaira players
Tigres de Quintana Roo players
Trenton Thunder players
Tulsa Drillers players
Vaqueros Laguna players